Nicholas Motloung (born 5 September 1995) is a South African soccer player who plays as a defender for National First Division club Venda. He played youth football for Kaizer Chiefs but was released by the club in 2015.

References

1995 births
Living people
South African soccer players
Association football defenders
Polokwane City F.C. players
Tshakhuma Tsha Madzivhandila F.C. players
South African Premier Division players
National First Division players